Mörby station is a railway station on the Roslagsbanan 891 mm narrow gauge railway located in Danderyd Municipality northeast of Stockholm, Sweden.

Opened in 1906, the station is not directly adjacent to the nearby Danderyds sjukhus metro station (opened in 1978), but it is just a few hundred meters away from it, allowing for interchange by just a short walk.

The primary maintenance shop for Roslagsbanan, Mörby verkstäder, is located just south of the station.

Gallery

References

Railway stations in Stockholm County
Railway stations opened in 1906
1906 establishments in Sweden